The meridian 107° west of Greenwich is a line of longitude that extends from the North Pole across the Arctic Ocean, North America, the Pacific Ocean, the Southern Ocean, and Antarctica to the South Pole.

The 107th meridian west forms a great circle with the 73rd meridian east.

From Pole to Pole
Starting at the North Pole and heading south to the South Pole, the 107th meridian west passes through:

{| class="wikitable plainrowheaders"
! scope="col" width="130" | Co-ordinates
! scope="col" | Country, territory or sea
! scope="col" | Notes
|-
| style="background:#b0e0e6;" | 
! scope="row" style="background:#b0e0e6;" | Arctic Ocean
| style="background:#b0e0e6;" |
|-
| style="background:#b0e0e6;" | 
! scope="row" style="background:#b0e0e6;" | Byam Martin Channel
| style="background:#b0e0e6;" |
|-
| 
! scope="row" | 
| Nunavut — Melville Island
|-valign="top"
| style="background:#b0e0e6;" | 
! scope="row" style="background:#b0e0e6;" | Parry Channel
| style="background:#b0e0e6;" | Viscount Melville Sound — passing just west of Stefansson Island, Nunavut,  (at )
|-
| 
! scope="row" | 
| Nunavut — Victoria Island
|-
| style="background:#b0e0e6;" | 
! scope="row" style="background:#b0e0e6;" | Dease Strait
| style="background:#b0e0e6;" |
|-valign="top"
| 
! scope="row" | 
| Nunavut Northwest Territories — from  Saskatchewan — from 
|-valign="top"
| 
! scope="row" | 
| Montana Wyoming — from  Colorado — from  New Mexico — from 
|-valign="top"
| 
! scope="row" | 
| Chihuahua Durango — from  Sinaloa — from 
|-
| style="background:#b0e0e6;" | 
! scope="row" style="background:#b0e0e6;" | Pacific Ocean
| style="background:#b0e0e6;" |
|-
| style="background:#b0e0e6;" | 
! scope="row" style="background:#b0e0e6;" | Southern Ocean
| style="background:#b0e0e6;" |
|-
| 
! scope="row" | Antarctica
| Unclaimed territory
|-
|}

See also
106th meridian west
108th meridian west

w107 meridian west